Thomas or Tom Forbes may refer to:

Thomas Forbes, poet and painter
Tom Forbes, character in The Affairs of Jimmy Valentine
Thomas Forbes, name of several of the Forbes family

See also